Acicula (singular: aciculum) are strong, stout internal chaetae that provide support to parapodia in polychaete annelids.

References

Annelid anatomy